The men's 100 metres sprint competition of the athletics events at the 2011 Pan American Games took place between the 24 and 25 of October at the Telmex Athletics Stadium. The defending Pan American Games champion was Churandy Martina formerly of the Netherlands Antilles. However, he did not defend his title as he has switched allegiance to the Netherlands.

Kim Collins won the silver medal, the first ever medal for Saint Kitts and Nevis at the Pan American Games.

Records
Prior to this competition, the existing world and Pan American Games records were as follows:

Qualification
Each National Olympic Committee (NOC) was able to enter up to two entrants providing they had met the minimum standard (10.38) in the qualifying period (January 1, 2010 to September 14, 2011).

Schedule

Results
All times shown are in seconds.

Heats
Held on October 24. The first two in each heat and the next 6 six fastest advanced to the semifinals.

Wind:Heat 1: -1.0, Heat 2: +1.2, Heat 3: -0.2, Heat 4: -2.0, Heat 5: -0.1

Semifinals
Held on October 24. The top four in each heat advanced to the final.

Wind:Heat 1: -1.9, Heat 2: +0.4

Final
Held on October 25.

Wind: +0.2

References

Athletics at the 2011 Pan American Games
2011